John Howden may refer to:

 John Power Howden (1879–1959), Canadian MP
 John Howden (bishop), bishop of Sodor and Man
 John of Howden (died 1275), English Franciscan friar
 John Howden (MP for City of York) for City of York